The Malaysian national ice hockey team is the national men's ice hockey team of Malaysia. The team is controlled by the Malaysia Ice Hockey Federation and has been an associate member of the International Ice Hockey Federation (IIHF) since 28 September 2006. Malaysia is currently not ranked in the IIHF World Ranking and have not entered in any World Championship tournaments or at any Olympic Games, but have played in the Challenge Cup of Asia, a regional tournament for lower-tier hockey nations in Asia.

Ice hockey was part of the 2017 SEA Games held in Kuala Lumpur. The IIHF announced that Malaysia will make its World Championship debut in 2020.

Malaysian Invitational 3-on-3 Hockey Tournament
In the 2009 edition of this tournament, the Malaysian team defeating Hong Kong in a thrilling game by a score of 8–7 in front of a huge crowd at Sunway Pyramid.
In 2010, the Malaysian team was undefeated on their way to the final against Kuwait. In the final, thanks to some great goaltending, Malaysia hung on to a 5–4 victory and their second MIHF tournament victory in as many years.

Tournament record

World Championships
2020 – Cancelled due to the COVID-19 pandemic
2021 – Cancelled due to the COVID-19 pandemic
2022 – 48th place
2023 – 52nd place

Asian Winter Games
 2007 – 8th place
 2011 – 10th place (5th in Premier Division)
 2017 – 15th place (5th in Division II)

Challenge Cup of Asia
 2008 –  2nd place
 2009 –  3rd place
 2010 – 4th place
 2012 –  3rd place
 2013 – 5th place
 2015 – 10th place (5th in Division I)
 2016 – 7th place ( 2nd in Division I)
 2017 – 5th place
 2018 – 6th place ( 1st in Division I)
 2019 – 4th place

Southeast Asian Games
 2017 –  3rd place
 2019 – 4th place

All-time record against other nations
Last match update: 08 March 2018

References

External links

IIHF profile

Ice hockey in Malaysia
National ice hockey teams in Asia
Ice hockey